The Two Island River is a  river in northeastern Minnesota, the United States. It flows into Lake Superior at Taconite Harbor.

Two Island River was named for the two lake islands near its mouth.

See also
List of rivers of Minnesota

References

External links
Minnesota Watersheds
USGS Hydrologic Unit Map - State of Minnesota (1974)

Rivers of Minnesota
Tributaries of Lake Superior
Rivers of Cook County, Minnesota
Rivers of Lake County, Minnesota